Pruska kultura, also known as Les Martyes de la Pologne, or Prussian Culture, is a 1908 Polish silent film that was about the 1901 Września student revolt. Thought to be a lost film until 2000, it was discovered in an archive in Paris, France by Professor Małgorzata Hendrykowska and Marek Hendrykowski.  The film was premiered within the Russian Empire in 1908, but was quickly censored by the Tsarist authorities after its showing. However, the film continued to be shown in Italy and France with French subtitles.

References

1908 films
Polish-language films
Polish silent films
Polish black-and-white films
1900s rediscovered films
Rediscovered Polish films